Madhusudhan Rao may refer to:

 V. Madhusudhana Rao (1923–2012), Indian film director, producer and screenwriter
 Madhusudhan Rao (actor), Indian actor